Rafael David (Rafi) Milo (born April 17, 1972) is an Israel Defense Forces major general (Aluf) who currently serves as the commander of the Homefront Command.

Milo previously served as the commander of the IDF staff college, 91st "Galilee Territorial Division, 80th "Edom" Territorial Division, Shayetet 13, Baram Territorial Brigade and the Etzioni Brigade.

Biography 
Milo, Son of Uri and Eva, was born and grew up in the Moshav Kfar Yedidia. He is named after his uncle, Major (Rasan) Rafi Milo who was killed during Operation Raviv. He joined the IDF in August 1990 and volunteered to the naval special operations unit, Shayetet 13. After completing the warrior course training in the Shaytet, he then went to the infantry officer course. At the end of the course he returned to the Shaytet, and was appointed a platoon commander and served there during the South Lebanon conflict as well as during Operation Accountability. in 1996 after a service of 6 years he was released of active service. due to the Ansariya ambush, he returned to the unit in 1997. later he transferred to the Golani Brigade and became deputy commander of Unit Egoz. After that he served as commander of the Golani reconnaissance unit during the Second Intifada. 

In 2003 he was promoted to the rank of lieutenant colonel (Sgan-Aluf) and appointed commander of the 13th battalion of the Golani Brigade and served in that role until November 2005. On December 27 2004, The Chief of Staff, Moshe Ya'alon, decided to reprimand him, following an incident in which three Egyptian policemen were accidentally killed, during an operational activity carried out by the battalion under his command, in the Gaza Strip. On November 2005 he commanded the brigade during the 2005 Hezbollah cross-border raid and participated in the killing of one of the Hezbollah militants. In the same month, An Israeli who surfed off the Manara cliff drifted towards Lebanese territory, Milo, that held a line in the sector with his battalion, arrived at the scene, and began a rescue operation under Hezbollah fire, after they too recognized the surfer and advanced towards him in order to kidnap him, he crossed the fence and rescued the civilian. For his action to prevent the abduction of the citizen and the deterioration of the security situation on the northern border, he was awarded am Aluf citation by the commander of the Northern Command, Udi Adam. In 2005, he was appointed commander of a fighter squadron in Shayetet 13, and served in the position until 2007. He led it, among other things, in the Second Lebanon War. During the war he led the main force in the Tyre raid. For his part in the war, including in that operation , he was awarded am Aluf citation by the commander of the Navy, David Ben-Besht.

In 2008 he was promoted to the rank of colonel (Aluf-Mishne) and was appointed commander of the Etzioni Brigade, during his service there, he lost his personal computer which had classified files and information. the Chief of Staff Gabi Ashkenazi, Determined as punishment that his appointment in 2010 as commander of Shayetet 13 will be canceled, and his possible promotion to the position will be delayed for two years. in August 25 2010 he was appointed commander of the Baram Territorial Brigade, a role which he served it until June 2012. On June 19 2012 he was appointed commander of Shayetet 13, a role which he served in until July 2 2014. at the end of his service he left to study at the National Security College in Canada.

On July 29 2015 Milo was promoted to the rank of brigadier general (Tat-Aluf) and was appointed commander of the 80th "Edom" Territorial Division, a role which he served in until  May 24 2017. On July 18 2017 he was appointed commander of the 91st "Galilee" Territorial Division. During his service in the position, he led the Northern Shield operation. At the end of the operation, he decided to examine for himself the other side of one of the Hezbollah tunnels, the largest of them, On his own accord and without coordination with his commanders, and after he believed that there was no longer any risk from doing so. he marched at the head of a small force along the tunnel to its end, in the village of Ramyah in southern Lebanon. As a result, the Chief of Staff, Aviv Kochavi, decided to reprimand him and delay his promotion in rank until 2022. He finished his role in August 12 2019. In october 2019 he was appointed commander of the IDF Command and Staff College. In May 2020 he announced that he intends to resign from his position and retire from his military service, but in July 2020 he retracted the statement and said that he will not retire from the IDF. On June 30 2022 he was promoted to the rank of major general (Aluf) and on July 18 started his position as commander of the Home Front Command.

Awards and decorations 
Rafael Milo was awarded three campaign ribbons for his service during three conflicts, as well as two Aluf Citation.

Personal life 
Milo has a wife and is the father of 3 children.

References 

Moshavniks
Israeli generals
1972 births
Living people